Siva Manasulo Sruthi (abbreviated as SMS) is a 2012 Indian Telugu-language romantic comedy film which is a remake of the successful  2009 Tamil film Siva Manasula Sakthi directed by M. Rajesh. The film is directed by Tatineni Satya and produced by Vikram Raju under Vega Entertainment. It stars Sudheer Babu and Regina Cassandra (in her Telugu debut).

Synopsis 
Siva is a carefree young man who works in a courier company as a delivery boy. During a train journey, he comes across Sruthi, who works as a radio jockey. Siva instantly falls for Sruthi and he starts trying to impress her. Sruthi reluctantly starts reciprocating his love over time. But just as Sruthi is about to express her love, Siva breaks her heart with his careless nature and uncultured ways. A love-hate relationship begins as the story moves back and forth between love failure and success. Jealousy, possessiveness and anger rear their ugly heads. Towards the end, the movie takes an unexpected twist. Siva and Sruthi are forced to take a stand over their future. What they will do forms the story.

Cast 
 Sudheer Babu as Siva
 Regina Cassandra as Sruthi
 Chanti as Siva's friend
 Vennela Kishore as Sruthi's brother
 Y. Kasi Viswanath as Sruthi's father
 Mirchi Hemanth (Guest appearance)
 Rohini as Siva's mother
 Subbaraju as Police Officer (cameo)
 Thagubothu Ramesh
 Harsha Vardhan
 Priyanka Nalkari as Siva's Sister

Release and reception 
The film was released in India and overseas on 10 February 2012. The movie was received with positive reviews. Suresh Kavirayani of the Times of India gave a 3 out of 5 rating and said the film was fresh and Sudheer's acting was appreciable. Mahesh from 123 Telugu also gave a 3 out of 5 rating and commented that the film was a decent one to watch and praised Sudheer for his dances and fights. Jeevi from Idlebrain gave a positive 3 out of 5 rating for the movie and said that the youth orientation and entertainment in the film make it a decent watch and categorized performances by Sudheer and Regina as plus points for the film. Reviewer's from NDTV gave a positive review and said it was a good beginning for Sudheer and praised his ease in dance and action scenes. They also praised Regina's performance in the film. The Hindustan Times gave a 3 ou of 5 rating and said that the film is a time pass watch and is worth every single penny that spent on buying the ticket.

Music 

The film music was composed by V. Selvaganesh. The songs "Cheliya" and the "Theme of SMS" were retained from the original soundtrack of Siva Manasula Sakthi composed by Yuvan Shankar Raja.

Awards and nominations

References 

2010s Telugu-language films
2012 films
Telugu remakes of Tamil films